Valentin Belon (born 5 July 1995) is a French professional footballer who most recently played as a goalkeeper for Ligue 1 club RC Lens.

Club career
Belon is a youth exponent from RC Lens. He made his debut for the club on 24 October 2014, in a 2–0 victory against Toulouse. In July 2019 he joined Laval on a season-long loan.

References

1995 births
Living people
Association football goalkeepers
French footballers
Ligue 1 players
Ligue 2 players
Championnat National players
Championnat National 2 players
Championnat National 3 players
RC Lens players
Stade Lavallois players